Alfred Bergiton Evensen (17 August 1883 – 2 May 1942) was a Norwegian musician who in 1918 became leader of the Norwegian Army Band after Lt. Peter Jøsvold retired from the position.

References
Johansen, Vegar (2006). The Norwegian Army Band, Harstad.

1883 births
1942 deaths
Norwegian musicians
Bandleaders